The Golden Horse Award for Outstanding Taiwanese Filmmaker of the Year is an award presented annually at the Golden Horse Awards by the Taipei Golden Horse Film Festival Executive Committee. The latest ceremony was held in 2022, with Chen Ming-ze receiving the honor.

References

Golden Horse Film Awards